Jaan-Frederik Brunken (born 26 April 1990) is a Finnish-German tennis player. His highest ranking is 469th which was achieved on 2 April 2012. Currently his ATP player status is designated as "inactive" which usually indicates retirement or injury of uncertain duration. He was ranked No. 19 in the junior rankings.

In November 2012 Brunken changed his representative country from Germany to Finland. His mother is from Finland and he has citizenship in both countries.

References

External links 
 
 

Finnish male tennis players
German male tennis players
1990 births
Living people
German people of Finnish descent